Syed Khwaja Moinuddin (1924 – 1 October 1978), usually called Moin, was an Indian footballer. He competed in the men's tournament at the 1952 Summer Olympics.

Playing career
"Moin" was coached in the youth by Syed Abdul Rahim. He represented Hyderabad Eleven Hunters and Student Athletic Club, and Hyderabad Police. He served in the Police for 36 years, retiring as Inspector in 1977 and having played until 1963. He could not take part in the 1948 Olympics due to the absence of a sponsor but played in the 1952 Olympics under Sailen Manna and in the 1954 Asian Games. He captained India at home against Sweden in 1954 and Russia in 1955. He scored a hat-trick for Hyderabad in the third place match of the 1953–54 Santosh Trophy

Death
He died of a heart-attack in Hyderabad. His obituaries give his age at the time of death as 56.

Honours

India
 Colombo Cup: 1954

References

External links
 
 

1924 births
1978 deaths
Indian footballers
India international footballers
Olympic footballers of India
Footballers at the 1952 Summer Olympics
Footballers from Hyderabad, India
Association football forwards
Footballers at the 1954 Asian Games
Asian Games competitors for India